Abated Mass of Flesh is an American brutal death metal band formed in Murfreesboro, Tennessee, in 2011. The band consists of vocalist Matthew Plunkett, lead guitarist Zack Plunkett, rhythm guitarist Thomas and drummer Riley Wingate. They have been compared to Devourment, Dying Fetus, Impending Doom and Crimson Thorn.

History
Abated Mass of Flesh is project that was started in 2011 by Zack Plunkett. For the first year, he performed all the instruments and vocals and released an EP titled, Moth and Rust in the Temple of Putridity on July 6, 2011. The EP was also released by Sevared Records.

In 2012, Zack added his brother Matthew to take over on vocals and they began working on the next EP. They then added their friend Logan Hayworth to play bass after signing with Rottweiler Records.

In January 2013, Zack worked at a retail store and found drummer Kade Dodson, who came into the store and commented on Zack's shirt, a t-shirt of the brutal death metal band Dying Fetus. Dodson expressed interest in playing in a brutal death metal band, so Zack invited him to play for the band. The project became a full-fledged band by that point. Soon after, the band released their second EP titled Brutal Death and their third EP The Anatomy of Impurity the same year, both through Rottweiler Records. Brutal Death was recorded and mixed by Zack and mastered by Rocky Gray of Living Sacrifice, Soul Embraced and Evanescence fame. "The Anatomy Of Impurity" was recorded and mixed by Zack with vocal tracking and mastering handled by friend Jordan Casey. The band embarked on a mini tour that year, as well as their first, with Broken Flesh, performing on two dates in Arkansas and Texas. During this time, the band used Casey to record their debut studio album, titled The Omen King and released an EP called Deathcrusher in February the following year. "Deathcrusher" was once again recorded and mixed by Zack with Casey handling vocals and mastering duties. After the recording process of "The Omen King," Hayworth left the band, so they added their friend Max Tubville to take over the bass position.

In 2014, the band's debut album, The Omen King was released by Rottweiler Records. This was the last release through Rottweiler Records. Soon after the release, the band parted ways with Dodson. The band then found drummer Riley Wingate and his brother Thomas Wingate to take over rhythm guitars. With the new lineup, they recorded their first single "Violence" and released it on August 26, 2014. The band toured with Arkansas metalcore band Every Knee Shall Bow later that year.

In April 2015, the band traveled to Mexico City to perform at a festival called Exodo Fest with Broken Flesh. Later that year, in September, the band released their fifth EP, titled Abhorrent Postmortal Vicissity through Sevared Records and toured with the Georgia-based brutal death metal band Aborning right after.

On June 8, 2016, the band released a live album titled Descended Upon the Deceased. This release was recorded and engineered by Chris Knagge in Woodbury, Tennessee. It featured some older tracks with a few newer songs from their upcoming studio album Eternal Harvest.

On April 12, 2017, the band released their sixth EP titled Lacerated. The EP was recorded and mixed by Zack and was once again released through Sevared Records. Right after the release, the band returned to Mexico to play Exodo Fest once again. A few months later on August 25, 2017, the band released their second album, Eternal Harvest. The album was engineered by Sam Schneider in Murfreesboro, Tennessee. Within the same year, the band added Amber Mackenzie (half-sister of Thomas and Riley Wingate) to the lineup as a live member to perform bass.

In 2018, the band released a re-recording of the first EP Moth and Rust in the Temple of Putridity. This was also the first year the band would perform at AudioFeed music festival in Champaign, Illinois.  On October 18, 2018, it was announced that Kade Dodson, the band's former drummer, died from undisclosed circumstances at the age of 33 on October 12.

In the winter of 2019, the band traveled out for "The Hasten Revelation Tour" with A Hill To Die Upon, Taking the Head of Goliath and Death Requisite.

On February 14, 2020, the band released their eighth EP, Not Burned, which was recorded and mixed by Zack. Soon after, the band would tour again in March 2020 for the 2nd "Hasten Revelation Tour" alongside Taking the Head of Goliath, My Place Was Taken, Cardiac Rupture and a reunited Crimson Thorn. On September 4, 2020 the band released their ninth EP titled The Dead Will Never Forgive Us. This EP was once again recorded and mixed by Zack and mastered by Mychal Soto.

On August 26, 2021 the band self-released a single called "Enfleshed" and began working on their next studio album.

On April 15, 2022 the band released their third studio album The Existence Of Human Suffering. The album was recorded and mixed by Jordan Casey. The band hired drummer Joe Pelleter from PeelingFlesh, Vile Impregnation and ex-Strangled to play drums on the album, which were recorded by Mychal Soto. A few years prior, the band released a statement on social media requesting stories from their fanbase. The stories were to include life situations or events that shaped them into who they are. The band took those submitted stories and used them to write the lyrics for the album.

Name
The band's name was created by Zack, with the idea of "Abated" meaning to "reduce or take away" and "Mass of Flesh" signifying humanity as a whole. With that definition, the name is about diminishing the immoral acts of humanity.

Members
Current

Former

Timeline

Discography

Studio albums
 The Omen King (2014)
 Eternal Harvest (2017)
 The Existence of Human Suffering (2022)

EPs
 Moth and Rust in the Temple of Putridity (2011)
 Brutal Death (2013)
 The Anatomy of Impurity (2013)
 Deathcrusher (2014)
 Abhorrent Postmortal Vicissity (2015)
 Lacerated (2017)
 Moth and Rust in the Temple of Putridity (2018)
 Not Burned (2020)
 The Dead Will Never Forgive Us (2020)

Live
 Descended upon the Deceased (2016)
 Live and Completely Raw (2020)

Singles
 "Skin Stripped Away" (2011)
 "The Killer in Me" (2012)
 "Violence" (2014)
 "Gravecharmer" (2015)
 "Infectious Womb" (2017)
 "Shadowed By Light" (2017)
 "Drowning Beneath" (2017)
 "Undeserved" (2018)
 "Escape Route" (2020)
 "Torment Defined" (2020)

Other songs
 "Peace in the Galaxy" - Mortification (2011)

Compilation albums
Sands of Time (2017)

Compilation appearances
"The Killer in Me" - Christian Deathcore Vol. 2 (2013; Christian deathcore)
"Violence" - Christian Deathcore Vol. 3 (2014; Christian deathcore)
"Posthumous Transfiguration" - God's Metal Militia Volume 1 (2014; God's Metal Militia)
"Reflections of Suffering" - Christian Brutal Death Metal Volume 1 (2015; Christian brutal death metal)
"Violence" - United We Skate Benefit Comp - Vol. 5 Metal (2015; SkyBurnsBlack/Thumper Punk Records)
"Gravecharmer" and "Interminable Enslavement" - Christian Deathcore Vol. 4 (2015; Christian deathcore)
"Violence" - The Bearded Dragon's Sampler (2.0) (2016; The Bearded Dragon Productions)
"Shadowed by Light" - Metal From The Dragon (Vol. 1) (2017; The Bearded Dragon Productions)
"The Longest Thorn" - Christian Deathcore Vol. 5 (2017; Christian deathcore)

References

Musical groups established in 2011
American Christian metal musical groups
American deathcore musical groups
American death metal musical groups
Musical groups from Tennessee
Sevared Records artists
2011 establishments in Tennessee